The X Factor is a British television music competition to find new singing talent; the winner of which receives a £1 million recording contract with the Syco Music record label. The first series was broadcast from 4 September to 11 December 2004. The competition was split into several stages: auditions, bootcamp, judges' homes and live shows, with Louis Walsh, Sharon Osbourne and Simon Cowell as judges. Kate Thornton presented the show on ITV, whilst Ben Shephard presented the spin-off show The Xtra Factor on ITV2.

Auditions were held in Dublin, Newcastle, London, Leeds, Birmingham and Glasgow.

Steve Brookstein won the series, with Cowell as the winning mentor. Brookstein went on to have some chart success, with runner-up group G4 achieving two platinum albums before splitting up in 2007, but reuniting in 2014.

Selection process

Applications and auditions
Before the auditions, advertisements appeared on ITV, newspapers, and trade magazines, promising that the new show would encourage groups to join, and while the emphasis was on singing, would welcome those who played musical instruments and wrote their own songs. The show would differentiate itself from its predecessor, Pop Idol.

For the first episode of auditions, which aired on 4 September 2004, the judges visited Leeds and London. The second episode aired on 11 September 2004 in which the judges visited Newcastle. The third aired on 18 September 2004, the fourth on 25 September 2004 and the fifth on 2 October 2004.

Bootcamp and judges' houses
After the auditions, each judge was allocated a category at random:

Simon Cowell: Over 25s
Sharon Osbourne: 16-24s
Louis Walsh: Groups

Each judge chose 12 acts from their category to go through to round two. After bootcamp, each judge selected five acts to progress to the judges' homes round. The bootcamp episodes aired on 9 and 16 October 2004.

In judges' homes, the 15 acts went to the homes of their respective judges, where they were interviewed and performed again. Each judge then chose three acts to go through to the live shows, making a total of nine finalists.

Bootcamp Tasks per Category

16-24s:

Location: Hackney Empire

Task 1: Perform "Isn't She Lovely" by Stevie Wonder in lines of 10.

Task 2: Giving a solo performance of one of these two chosen songs below:
  "Love Grows (Where My Rosemary Goes)" 
 "Midnight Train to Georgia"

Task 3: Interviews in front of the press and talking about their personal lives.

Task 4: Choose one song from The Beatles back-catalogue and perform it in front of their competitors and Sharon.

Groups:

Location: Angel Recording Studios

Task 1: Perform a song of their own choosing in front of Louis and his team.

Task 2: Write an original song entitled 
"Right Now" that must contain all these five words:
 Dreams
 Hope
 Anticipation
 Chance
 All the Way

Task 3: Learn a new song overnight

Task 4: Sing a song that they think that showcases all of their members voices to the best of their ability.

Over 25s:

Location: The Landmark London

Task 1: Both the females and males perform one song of their choice separately one at a time with the opposite gender watching their performance.

Task 2: Learn a new song overnight with another member of the category to perform as an duo.

Task 3: Perform a song that will convince Simon and his panel that they are capable of moving on to the next round.

Judges Houses Performances (Groups and 16-24s)

16-24s:
 Cassie: "Anyone Who Had a Heart"
 Megan: "Fly Me to the Moon"
 Andy: "Try a Little Tenderness"
 Roberta: "Cry Me a River"
 Tabby: "Maggie May"

Groups:
 Voices With Soul: "I Will Always Love You"
 2 to Go: "From This Moment On"
 4Tune: Original Song
 Advance: "To Love Somebody"
 G4: "Creep"

Acts 

Key:
 – Winner
 – Runner-Up

Live shows

Format 
Two live shows were broadcast each Saturday evening during the competition. Until week 5, each act performed once in the first show, then the public voted for the act that they wanted to remain in the show. In the other results show, the two acts with the fewest votes were revealed. These two acts then had to sing again before the three judges decided whom to eliminate.

The format changed in the sixth week: each act performed twice in the first show and performed one of their songs in the results show. The act with the fewest votes was eliminated at the end of the second show.

The live shows started on 23 October 2004 and ended on 11 December 2004.

Results summary
Colour key
 Act in team Simon

 Act in team Sharon

 Act in team Louis

 Cowell was not required to vote as there was already a majority.

Live show details

Week 1 (23 October)

 Best Bits song: "Beautiful"

Judges' votes to eliminate
 Walsh: Roberta Howett – backed his own act, Voices with Soul.
 Osbourne: Voices with Soul – backed her own act, Roberta Howett.
 Cowell: Roberta Howett – based on the final showdown performance, but felt that neither act deserved to be in the bottom two.

Week 2 (30 October)

 Best bits song: "Over The Rainbow"

Judges' votes to eliminate
 Walsh: Verity Keays – backed his own act, 2 to Go.
 Cowell: 2 to Go – backed his own act, Verity Keays.
 Osbourne: Verity Keays – gave no reason.

Week 3 (6 November)

 Best bits song: "Endless Love"

Judges' votes to eliminate
 Osbourne: 2 to Go – gave no reason.
 Walsh: 2 to Go – said he did not want to send either of his acts home. He asked to vote last but Thornton pressed him for his decision.
 Cowell was not required to vote as there was already a majority.

Week 4 (13 November)

 Best bits song: "That's What Friends Are For"

Judges' votes to eliminate
 Osbourne: Voices with Soul – based on the final showdown performance, and believed that G4 had a future in a recording career.
 Cowell: G4 – gave no reason.
 Walsh: Voices with Soul – said he did not want to send either of his acts home, saying the result was worse than last week; he tried to back out but Thornton forced him for his decision.

Week 5 (20 November)

 Best bits song: "Goodbye"

Judges' votes to eliminate
 Walsh: Cassie Compton – believed Callaghan could win the competition.
 Osbourne abstained from voting as both acts were in her category. Thornton tried to remind her of her duty to vote between her acts as Walsh did in the previous two results shows, but Osbourne still refused to send home either of her acts, citing her loyalty to both of them. Following this, Thornton warned Cowell that if he voted to send Compton through to the quarter-final, the result would revert to the public vote to decide who would be eliminated.
 Cowell: Cassie Compton – wanted to win the competition and believed Callaghan was his biggest threat but after deliberating on whether to send home either Callaghan or Compton, who he felt was the weakest, opted to send Compton home.

Week 6: Quarter-Final (27 November)

 Best bits song: "She"

The quarter-final did not feature a final showdown and instead the act with the fewest public votes, Rowetta Satchell, was automatically eliminated

Week 7: Semi-Final (4 December)

 Best bits song: "I Don't Want to Miss a Thing"

The semi-final did not feature a final showdown and instead the act with the fewest public votes, Tabby Callaghan, was automatically eliminated.

Week 8: Final (11 December)

Reception

Ratings
This series achieved an average of 7.4 million viewers per episode.

Controversies

Cheating

It was reported in tabloid newspapers that the show's audition process was unfair after Walsh was accused of cheating. He was thought to have advised the group Co-Ed on things such as song choices, which caused controversy after it was revealed that he had actually previously managed Co-Ed after they appeared on the Irish version of Popstars in 2001. Also, footage of Cowell and Osbourne coaching contestants to argue back to the judges was being auctioned over the Internet.

Claims of Rigging

Before the first live show, Osbourne accused Cowell of "rigging" the show by editing footage to make the contestants in his category more appealing to viewers. Osbourne attracted criticism again following the final in December 2004 when she was forced to make an apology after attracting what Cowell referred to as "record complaints" over an outburst by Osbourne in which she criticised eventual winner Steve Brookstein. This left her place on the show uncertain, although she returned for the second series in 2005.

References

 01
2004 British television seasons
2004 in British music
2004 in British television
United Kingdom 01